The 1995–96 Cypriot Second Division was the 41st season of the Cypriot second-level football league. APOP won their 6th title.

Format
Fourteen teams participated in the 1995–96 Cypriot Second Division. All teams played against each other twice, once at their home and once away. The team with the most points at the end of the season crowned champions. The first three teams were promoted to 1996–97 Cypriot First Division and the last three teams were relegated to the 1996–97 Cypriot Third Division.

Changes from previous season
Teams promoted to 1995–96 Cypriot First Division
 Evagoras Paphos
 Alki Larnaca

Teams promoted from 1994–95 Cypriot Third Division
 Ethnikos Latsion
 Ayia Napa
 Digenis Akritas Morphou
 Chalkanoras Idaliou
 Ethnikos Assia

League standings

Results

See also
 Cypriot Second Division
 1995–96 Cypriot First Division
 1995–96 Cypriot Cup

Sources

Cypriot Second Division seasons
Cyprus
1995–96 in Cypriot football